Alan Bernheimer (born 1948 in New York City) is an American poet, often associated with the San Francisco Language poets.

Biography
He attended Horace Mann School, and graduated in 1970 from Yale College, where he became friends with poets Steve Benson, Kit Robinson, Rodger Kamenetz, and Alex Smith and studied literature with A. Bartlett Giamatti and Harold Bloom and poetry with Ted Berrigan, Peter Schjeldahl, and Bill Berkson. He was a member of Manuscript Society in his senior year.

He continued his association with the New York School poets and the St. Mark's Poetry Project for several years, and moved to San Francisco in 1976, where through Benson and Robinson he met other writers—such as Rae Armantrout, Carla Harryman, Lyn Hejinian, Tom Mandel, Ted Pearson, Bob Perelman, Ron Silliman, and Barrett Watten—who would soon become known as the San Francisco Language poets. Bernheimer wrote and performed for Poets Theater, and produced and hosted the radio program of new writing by poets, "In the American Tree" on KPFA from 1979 to 1980. He produces a photo portrait gallery of poets reading on flickr

Bernheimer worked as a corporate communications executive for Bay Area technology and solar companies. He is married to Melissa Riley, a former San Francisco public librarian and freedom-of-information activist.

Works 
From Nature, 2019, Cuneiform Press (Victoria, TX)
Younger Than Yesterday, 2017, SFMOMA Open Space
"A Little Tour of Provence", Nowhere Magazine, August 2015
The Spoonlight Institute, 2009, Adventures in Poetry (Princeton, NJ)
"Paris Journal", Nowhere Magazine, November 2009
"from THE SPOONLIGHT INSTITUTE", The Sienese Shredder #3
Billionesque, 1999, The Figures (Great Barrinton, MA) 
Cloud Eight, 1999, Sound & Language – with Kit Robinson
State Lounge, 1981, Tuumba (Berkeley, CA)
Café Isotope, 1980, The Figures (Berkeley, CA)

Translation
Lost Profiles: Memoirs of Cubism, Dada, and Surrealism (Philippe Soupault), 2016, City Lights (San Francisco, CA)  
The Hamlet of the Bees (Valery Larbaud), 1981, Whale Cloth

Plays
"Particle Arms," produced by San Francisco Poets Theater, 1982, published in Hills, 1983 and reprinted in The Kenning Anthology of Poets Theater 1945-1985, 2010

Anthologies
"20 Questions", The best American poetry, 2004, Editors	Lyn Hejinian, David Lehman, Simon and Schuster, 2004,

References

Other online resources
Electronic Poetry Center
Pennsound
mark(s)
Silliman's Blog
Wild Horses of Fire
Plainfeather's Blog
Poetry Project Newsletter #223, p. 24
Poetry Project Newsletter #220, p. 14

Dia Center for the Arts

1948 births
Poets from New York (state)
Language poets
Living people
Writers from New York City
Yale College alumni
Horace Mann School alumni